Cody Parkey (born February 19, 1992) is an American football placekicker who is a free agent. He played college football at Auburn and was signed by the Indianapolis Colts as an undrafted free agent in 2014. He has also been a member of the Philadelphia Eagles, Miami Dolphins, Chicago Bears, Tennessee Titans, and Cleveland Browns. He is known for having a potential game-winning kick deflected during a Chicago Bears playoff game, the Double Doink against his former team, the Eagles.

College career
Parkey played college football for the Auburn Tigers from 2010 to 2013. As a freshman in 2010, he only appeared in two games but made both extra points he attempted. As a sophomore in 2011, he converted 41 of 42 extra point attempts and 13 of 18 field goal attempts. As a junior in 2012, he converted all 27 extra point attempts and 11 of 14 field goal attempts. As a senior in 2013, he converted 66 of 67 extra point attempts and 15 of 21 field goal attempts.

Professional career

Indianapolis Colts
After going undrafted in the 2014 NFL Draft, Parkey signed with the Indianapolis Colts. He was traded by the Colts to the Philadelphia Eagles for running back David Fluellen on August 20, 2014.

Philadelphia Eagles

After a stellar preseason, Parkey beat out Alex Henery to be the Philadelphia Eagles' kicker for the 2014 season.

In 2014, Parkey set a new NFL rookie scoring record.  His 150 points broke Kevin Butler's 29-year-old record of 144 points set in 1985 with the Chicago Bears. Parkey tied with Stephen Gostkowski for the highest average of points scored per game in the 2014 NFL season. Parkey was named a first-alternative for the 2015 Pro Bowl. On January 18, 2015, Parkey replaced Gostkowski in the Pro Bowl due to the Patriots' involvement in Super Bowl XLIX.

On September 28, 2015, Parkey was placed on injured reserve with a groin injury.

On September 3, 2016, he was waived by the Eagles.

Cleveland Browns (first stint)
On September 24, 2016, Parkey signed with the Cleveland Browns after an injury to Patrick Murray.  Parkey was waived by the Browns on September 2, 2017.

Miami Dolphins
On September 3, 2017, Parkey was claimed off waivers by the Miami Dolphins. In Week 2, against the Los Angeles Chargers, Parkey was awarded AFC Special Teams Player of the Week for scoring 13 of the Dolphins 19 points (four field goals and an extra point), including a 54-yard game-winning field goal.

Chicago Bears

On March 14, 2018, Parkey signed a four-year contract with the Chicago Bears.

On November 11, 2018, against the Detroit Lions, Parkey had four kicks (two extra points and two field goals) strike the uprights; none went through. Despite his misses, the Bears won 34–22. In Week 11 against the Minnesota Vikings, Parkey made three field goals in the 25–20 win. He was named the NFC Special Teams Player of the Week for his performance. Parkey ended the regular season having made 23 of 30 field goal attempts.

Late in the 2018–19 NFC wild card playoff game against the Philadelphia Eagles, with the Bears down 16–15, Parkey had a chance to win the game on a 43-yard field goal. The Eagles called a timeout before the snap to negate Parkey's first field goal try. On his second attempt, Parkey's kick was a miss as the ball hit the left upright and crossbar before landing back out into the end zone. Parkey later reacted, "I feel terrible. There's really no answer to it. I thought I hit a good ball." The kick became known as the "Double Doink" after NBC color commentator Cris Collinsworth stated immediately afterward, "Oh my goodness, the Bears' season is going to end on a double doink". After the game, however, frame-by-frame replay showed that the kick was tipped by Eagles defensive tackle Treyvon Hester, which could have caused the ball to change trajectory and lean leftward. The NFL officially ruled that the kick was a blocked field goal.

Five days after the miss, Parkey discussed it with anchors of NBC's Today show in an appearance, a move for which he did not get clearance from the Bears front office and received criticism from local sportswriters and fans. Head coach Matt Nagy said in a press conference the following Monday, "We always talk about a ‘we’ and not a ‘me’ thing, and we always talk as a team, we win as a team, we lose as a team. I didn't necessarily think [the Today appearance] was too much of a ‘we’ thing.”

On February 22, 2019, it was reported Parkey would be released at the start of the league year after 11 missed kicks in his first season and $3.5 million guaranteed still on his 2019 contract. He was officially released on March 13, 2019.

Tennessee Titans
Parkey was signed by the Tennessee Titans on October 8, 2019. He was released on November 2, 2019, after Ryan Succop returned from injury.

Cleveland Browns (second stint)
The Browns signed Parkey to their practice squad on September 6, 2020. He was promoted to the team's active roster on September 14, 2020. He was placed on the reserve/COVID-19 list by the team on November 18, 2020, and activated three days later.

On March 19, 2021, Parkey re-signed with the Browns. The Browns placed Parkey on injured reserve on August 23, 2021. He was released off injured reserve on August 24, 2021.

New Orleans Saints
On October 6, 2021, Parkey signed with the New Orleans Saints. He suffered a groin injury in Week 5 and was released with an injury settlement on October 12.

References

External links
 Cleveland Browns bio
 Chicago Bears bio
 Auburn Tigers bio

1992 births
Living people
People from Jupiter, Florida
Players of American football from Florida
Sportspeople from the Miami metropolitan area
American football placekickers
Auburn Tigers football players
Indianapolis Colts players
Philadelphia Eagles players
Cleveland Browns players
Miami Dolphins players
Chicago Bears players
Tennessee Titans players
New Orleans Saints players
Unconferenced Pro Bowl players